Tokio Yokoi  (December 3, 1857 – September 13, 1927) was a Japanese pastor, journalist, bureaucrat, and member of the Japanese House of Representatives. He was also known as Tokio Ise.

Career 
Yokoi was born on December 3, 1857 in Higo province, which is now Kumamoto prefecture. He was the first son of Yokoi Shonan, a scholar and political reformer during the end of the Bakufu era. He was also related to Kanamori Michitomo, Tokutomi Soho, and Tokutomi Roka on his mother's side. 

Yokoi graduated in 1879, was baptized by Joseph Hardy Neesima, and became a missionary in Imabari, Ehime. Yokoi's conversion to Christianity was not taken well by his family; his mother threatened to commit suicide from shame.

In 1886, Yokoi resigned from his position as pastor at the Imabari church. After teaching at Doshisha University, he took over the Hongo Congregational Church in Tokyo from Ebina Danjo. During this period he became an admirer of Liberal Christianity, and wrote a book about it in 1894. It was called Waga kuni no Kirisuto-kyo Mondai .

In 1897, Yokoi started the Hinototori Konwakai (丁酉懇話会), and in the same year became president of the Doshisha School. He resigned in 1899 and worked in the Ministry of Communications until 1903, when he was elected to the House of Representatives, representing Okayama prefecture. He was a member of the Rikken Seiyukai political party. In 1909 Yokoi was interned because of his involvement with a corruption scandal. He resigned on May 6, 1909. He was imprisoned in Tokyo for five months and was fined 2,500 yen.

After his release, Yokoi became the managing editor of the Tokyo Nichi Nichi Shinbun and published a magazine called "Jidai Shicho". He also attended the Paris Peace Conference in 1919.

Yokoi died on September 13, 1927 in Beppu, Japan.

References 

1927 deaths
1857 births
People from Kumamoto
Members of the House of Representatives (Empire of Japan)
Presidents of universities and colleges in Japan
Japanese educators
Japanese magazine editors
Japanese journalists
Japanese Protestant missionaries
Pages with unreviewed translations